Universiti Kebangsaan Malaysia Football Club is a football club based in Bangi, Selangor, Malaysia. The club represents the National University of Malaysia.

History

Early years
The club was founded in 2013. They have been competing in Malaysian Institutes of Higher Education Football League and has won several college football competitions. UKM who won the Minister of Higher Education Ministry Cup and runners-up of Division One University Football League in 2014, was automatically eligible to join the 2015 Malaysia FAM League. Their place in Minister of Higher Education Ministry League was taken over by the  MMU, 2014 Minister of Higher Education Division Two University Football League champion.

In 2015, the club has been accepted by Football Association of Malaysia to compete in Malaysia FAM League, the third-tier of Malaysian football. The club also collaborated with Sime Darby to provide a youth players for the Sime Darby youth team which competed in Malaysia President's Cup.

2015 season

After successfully bringing UKM to be the champion of the Minister of Higher Education Ministry Cup and the runner-up of the University Football League Division 1, Sulaiman Hussin moved to Sime Darby and joined the President's Cup squad coaching. Asnan Mohamad Zuki, who led University of Malaya to become the Minister of Higher Education Ministry Cup 2013 champion after beating UKM, was appointed as the UKM FC coach. On their first season in Malaysia FAM League, they finished in fourth place behind Perlis, Real Mulia and Megah Murni. Only one team from each league promoted into 2016 Malaysia Premier League, and Perlis became runners-up of Malaysia FAM League that season after lost into Melaka United.

UKM FC vice captain, Hafizuddin Sulaiman became top goalscorers of the club after scoring 8 goals - even he played as the defender.

2016 season

UKM FC appointed Lim Kim Liang, ex Kuala Lumpur head coach and brought back Sulaiman Hussin as assistant head coach. They missed the spot into knock-out stage, as they finished fifth place. On this season, only top 4 of each league qualify into knock-out stage, and two teams into the finals automatically qualify into Malaysia Premier League.

UKM FC also qualified into Malaysia FA Cup for the first time. In the first round, they defeated Hanelang by penalty shout-out after draw 1–1 in UKM Bangi Stadium, their home base. Azri Zulkiflee scored in this match before Mohd Safix from Hanelang equalized. This match also the only UKM FC match at home in FA Cup history. In the second round, they lost into Kelantan at Sultan Mohammad IV Stadium.

2017 season

Sulaiman Hussin promoted into UKM FC head coach, and they managed to finish in the top of the league - only lost twice with FELCRA and MOF by 1–0 at home. In knock-out stage, UKM FC defeated Kuching 2–1 on quarter-final, before qualified into final stage after beating Shahzan Muda 1–0 on semi-final. UKM FC lost 2-3 into Sime Darby, but both of them already qualified into 2018 Malaysia Premier League. But one month after final, Sime Darby decided to withdraw from the Premier League next season and focused into develop youth football, ending their involvement as a professional club. The club now competes in the KLFA First Division state league as an amateur club.

On 2017 Malaysia FA Cup, they received the bye in the first round and defeated by Sabah at Likas Stadium in the second round.

2018 season
The club has been promoted to Malaysia Premier League despite losing in the 2017 Malaysia FAM League Finals against Sime Darby. At the beginning of the 2018 season, the club signed four foreign players including one player from Asia. They were Waheed Oseni, Redouane Zerzouri, Atuheire Kipson and Nam Se-in. Due to poor performance, Atuheire Kipson was dropped by the club during mid-season and he was replaced by former MISC-MIFA forward, Michael Chukwubunna.

The change galvanized UKM, as they finished the league season in 8th place, and were runners-up of the inaugural Malaysia Challenge Cup. Michael Chukwubunna also finished as top scorer in the latter competition with 13 goals.

2019 season
Despite the team good performance in the league and cup, UKM FC were barred to participate in the 2019 Malaysia Premier League by Malaysia Football League on 28 November 2018, after the club failed to submit their registration paperwork on time, and the paperwork sent to MFL after they are given 7 days grace period are incomplete. However, on 10 December 2018, they are given a second chance by MFL to appeal for reinstatement to Premier League, which they do successfully, although MFL served UKM with a fine and warning for their initial failure.

In this season, UKM recorded the biggest win in their Premier League history, as they demolished Sarawak 4–0 on March 2, 2019. They are also recorded the first ever win on Malaysia FA Cup history, won 5-1 after beating Protap at UKM Bangi Stadium on April 2, 2019.

2020 season and end of involvement in Malaysian League
In the truncated 2020 season due to COVID-19 pandemic, UKM FC managed to finish in the 9th position out of 12 teams. But the pandemic hit the football community hard on the finances, including the team. After the university management has pulled the full financial support and the team was re-registered under a new private entity, they failed to give FAM concrete proof they have financial backing for the 2021 season. As a consequence, FAM expelled the team from the Premier League.

Although UKM FC can apply for registration in the M3 League or below, as of 2022, they have not involved in any of the leagues.

Stadium and locations

Sponsors

Season by season record

 1 : They finished first in the league and qualified for knockout stage, ended as runners-up as they lost 2–3 on aggregate by Sime Darby.
 2 : Due to the COVID-19 pandemic, the tournament was cancelled.

Current squad

Development squads

Under-21s

Under-19s

Management team

Club personnel

Managerial history
Head coaches by years (2015–present)

Update on 12 October 2019.

Honours

Domestic competitions

League
Malaysia FAM League
Runners-up (1): 2017

Cup
Malaysia Challenge Cup
Runners-up (2): 2018, 2019

Affiliated clubs
 Sime Darby

References

External links
 

 
Malaysia Premier League clubs
Football clubs in Malaysia
National University of Malaysia
University and college association football clubs